Westerode is a village that forms a part (Stadtteil) of Bad Harzburg in the district of Goslar in Lower Saxony, Germany. As of 31 December 2020, Westerode had a population of 1,089.

Geography 
Westerode is located north of the Butterberg and Bad Harzburg city. It is penetrated by the Maschbach, a contributing creek of the Ecker.

Gallery

References 

Goslar (district)
Bad Harzburg